Kivistö is a district of Seinäjoki, Finland. It is located about three kilometers to the southeast from the city center. The population of Kivistö was 3 129 in 2012. The western Kivistö is a part of the Kantakaupunki ward and the eastern Kivistö is a part of the Kasperi ward. The district has several services such as a school, a convenience store and a pub.

Gallery

References 

Neighbourhoods in Seinäjoki